The Cooch Behar Trophy is India's national four-day cricket tournament for under-19 players. It has been held annually since the 1945–46 season. It is run by the Board of Control for Cricket in India.

History
The trophy was donated by, and named after, the family of the Maharaja of Cooch Behar. From 1945–46 to 1986–87 the Cooch Behar Trophy was a schools competition. It changed to an under-19 competition in 1987–88.

Current format 
Matches are played over four days. All the Ranji Trophy teams field sides, except for Railways and Services. The sides are divided into four groups, each of which plays a round-robin. After the group matches are completed, quarter-finals, semi-finals and a final are held.

Prominent players
Many Test players have been prominent in the Cooch Behar Trophy in their youth. Budhi Kunderan and Rusi Surti scored centuries in North Zone Schools' victory in the 1954–55 final. Ashok Mankad represented West Zone Schools in the final for three consecutive seasons from 1960–61 to 1962–63.  Karsan Ghavri and Mohinder Amarnath were the leading bowlers on opposing sides in a semi-final in 1967–68. Sachin Tendulkar scored 214 for Bombay Under-19s in 1988–89. He made his Test debut less than a year later.

In the final in 1999–2000 Yuvraj Singh made 358 in Punjab Under-19s' total of 839 for 5. According to Yuvraj, the Cooch Behar Trophy was second only to the Ranji Trophy in importance for young cricketers at the time, but has declined in status since then, supplanted by the Indian Premier League.

References

External links
 Photo of Vidarbha Under-19s and the Trophy in 2017–18

Indian domestic cricket competitions